Stenoma vapida is a moth in the family Depressariidae. It was described by Arthur Gardiner Butler in 1877. It is found in Brazil in the states of Pará and Amazonas.

References

Moths described in 1877
Stenoma